Clavatula decorata is a species of sea snail, a marine gastropod mollusk in the family Clavatulidae.

Description
The length of the shell attains 21 mm, its width 8 mm.

(From the original description) The fusiform shell is one of striking character. The spire is acutely turreted and contains 10 whorls. The whorls are unusually concave, with a stout prominent keel, crossed by numerous oblong somewhat oblique white tubercles or short plicae, which are rendered more conspicuous by a brown intersecting spiral line.

Distribution
This species occurs in the Atlantic Ocean off Sierra Leone.

References

External links

decorata
Gastropods described in 1916